Pond Pine Wilderness was designated in 1984, and it covers  in the Croatan National Forest in eastern North Carolina.  The Wilderness Area is a vast wetland, and it lacks trails and campsites.  Travel through this wilderness is difficult.

See also
 List of U.S. Wilderness Areas
 Wilderness Act

References

External links
 Pond Pine Wilderness, Wilderness.net website

Protected areas of Craven County, North Carolina
Protected areas of Jones County, North Carolina
IUCN Category Ib
Croatan National Forest
Protected areas established in 1984
Wilderness areas of North Carolina
1984 establishments in North Carolina